Arakan Army is a Rakhine insurgent group in Myanmar. The name may also refer to:
 Arakan Army (Kayin State)
 Arakan Rohingya Salvation Army